Rt. Hon. Sheriff Oborevwori (born 19 June 1963) is a Nigerian politician and incumbent Speaker of the Delta State House of Assembly as a representative of the Okpe State Constituency under the People's Democratic Party (Nigeria) Peoples Democratic Party and the governor elect of Delta state as of march 20th 2023 after winning the gubernatorial elections that was conducted on march 18th 2023(PDP).

Early childhood and education 
Sheriff Oborevwori was born on 19 June 1963, to the family of Chief Samuel and Mrs. Esther Oborevwori of Osubi town in Okpe Local Government Area of Delta State. He began his early childhood education at Alegbo primary school and completed his secondary education at Oghareki Grammar School, Oghareki. He graduated from the prestigious Ambrose Ali University, Ekpoma with a bachelor's degree in political science in 2004 and later proceeded to obtain a master's degree in political science from the Delta State University Abraka in 2010. Oborevwori is an alumnus of the Alliance Manchester Business School of Manchester University Leadership Executive Certificate Programme and the London School of Economics and Political Science certificate Programme on Leading Inclusive Development.

Political career
Oborevwori began his political career as a grassroot politician; Chairman of the Okpe Community. However he broke into limelight in 2015 after he was elected as the member representing Okpe State Constituency in the Delta State House of Assembly under the Peoples Democracy Party (PDP). This is after 19 years of serving in several key government positions first beginning as a Councillor in 1996. He was elected speaker of Delta State House of Assembly on 11 May 2017 following the impeachment of the then Speaker, Rt. Hon. Monday Igbuya. Speaker, Rt. Hon. Monday Igbuya. He re-elected in 2019 as Speaker for a second term following his victory at the polls to represent his constituency, the Okpe State Constituency at the Delta State House of Assembly.

Professional affiliations, awards and special recognition 
Oborevwori is a member of several professional bodies including the Nigerian Institute of Management (Chartered). He is also a fellow of the Chartered Management Consultant Chartered Institute of Management Consultants, Canada and Fellow of the Institute Chartered Mediators and Conciliators (FICMC). On May 14, 2018, he was recognized by the National Association of Nigerian Students (NANS) with a Legislative Icon Award through in honour of its several educational endeavours/scholarship programmes in supports of students across Delta State. He also received an honour from his kinsmen and was dabbed with a Chieftaincy Title; the Ukodo of Okpe by His Royal Majesty, the Orhorho 1, Orodje of Okpe in recognition of his contribution to the growth and development of the Okpe Kingdom.

Philanthropy activities 
It was reported that Rt. Hon. Oborevwori provided scholarships to 25 indigene and non-indigene students in Okpe Local Government for the 2018/2019 academic session and other empowerment packs to the tune of six million naira on 24 June 2018 The educational support programme which was launched under the Oborevwori Foundation Scholarship Scheme was accompanied by other entrepreneurship support/empowerment endeavours to support petty traders, market women and artisans. The philanthropic gesture witnessed the donation of 24 buses/cars 10 tricycles, 20 hair dressing saloon kits, including generators, 40 grinding machines for millers, 30 sewing machines for tailors, 20 deep freezers for market women in frozen food business and clothing hundreds of clothing for widows.

Life and family 
Sheriff Oborevwori is married to Mrs. Oborevwori Tobore. In May 2011, it was reported that she was allegedly abducted by gunmen along Osubi road in Okpe Local Government Area of Delta State. The culprits were later arrested and sentenced to 21 years imprisonment.

References

1963 births
Living people
Nigerian politicians